Lardjem is a district in Tissemsilt Province, Algeria. It was named after its capital, Lardjem.

Municipalities
The district is further divided into 4 municipalities:
Lardjem
Tamelaht 
Melaâb
Sidi Lantri

Districts of Tissemsilt Province